Clyde Randy Boone (born January 17, 1942) is an American actor and singer best known for his role in the series The Virginian as Randy Benton, a young ranch hand who played guitar and sang.

Early life
Boone was born in Fayetteville, North Carolina, and enrolled at North Carolina State College as a mathematics major. He began performing as a folk singer at a bar and eventually dropped out of school to play guitar and sing. That decision led to 18 months of traveling around the United States, primarily by hitchhiking. He used his musical talents to barter, with his performances providing meals and sleeping quarters. He entered contests to win additional money.

Career 

Boone started his career in the 1962–1963 TV series It's a Man's World as Vern Hodges, a talented guitarist from Boone's native North Carolina. 

After playing guitar and singing in The Virginian and starring as a country singer in the 1966 film Country Boy, he played Francis Wilde in Western series Cimarron Strip along Stuart Whitman.

Filmography (selection)

Film 
 1969: Backtrack!
 1973: Terminal Island
 1975: Dr. Minx
 1987: The Wild Pair

TV 
 1962–1963: It's a Man's World
 1963: Alfred Hitchcock Presents
 1963: Amazing Stories
 1963 Wagon Train, (2 episodes) Noah Bancroft, David Garner
 1963 The Twilight Zone

 1964: The Fugitive 
 1964–1966: The Virginian  
 1966  Combat
 1966: Bonanza
 1967–1968: Cimarron Strip 
 1973: Emergency! 
1974: Kolchak: The Night Stalker
 1975: Kung Fu
 1975: Gunsmoke 
 1985: Highway to Heaven

References

External links
 
  

1942 births
20th-century American male actors
American male film actors
American male television actors
Male Western (genre) film actors
Western (genre) television actors
Living people